KADF-LD (channel 20) is a low-power television station in Austin, Texas, United States, affiliated with Ace TV. It is owned by Bridge Media Networks. On cable, the station is seen on Spectrum on channel 14 in the Austin area in addition to its over-the-air broadcast signal.

Recent developments
On November 21, 2022, Bridge Media Networks, the parent company of 24/7 headline news service NEWSnet, announced it would acquire KADF-LD from Joseph W. Shaffer for $825,000. Upon the completion of the transaction, Bridge will make KADF-LD the first NEWSnet owned-and-operated station in the state of Texas. The sale was consummated on January 12, 2023.

Technical information

Subchannels
The station's digital channel is multiplexed:

References

External links

ADF-LD
Television channels and stations established in 2006